Seti se moje pesme (trans. "Remember My Song") is the first and only album by former Yugoslav hard rock  band Apartman 69 released in 1983. Following the release of the album, the band disbanded due to lack of popularity. In 1996 Zoran Zdravković, band's guitar player formed the band Kraljevski Apartman, but none of the tracks from Apartman 69 were performed. The album was never released on CD.

Track listing

Side one 

"Vesnine jesenje kiše" (Z. Zdravković, D. Janković, A69) - 2:55
"Seti se moje pesme" (D. Blažić, A69) - 5:12
"Budim se" (D. Dimitrijević,D. Blažić, A69) - 3:44
"Sećanje No 1" (Z. Zdravković, D. Janković, A69) - 3:08

Side two 

"Lažeš me, Ana" (Z. Zdravković, D. Blažić, D. Janković, A69) - 4:08
"Ama, ti si ona ista" (Z. Zdravković, D. Janković, A69) - 3:12
"Sećanje No 2" (D. Blažić, D. Janković, A69) - 4:22
"Apartman 69" (M. Jovanović, A69) - 3:08

Personnel 

Dragan Blažić - vocals
Zoran Zdravković - guitar
Milan Mastelica - bass guitar, backing vocals
Jovan Simonović - drums
Dejan Mihajlović - keyboards, backing vocals

External links

Kraljevski Apartman albums
1983 debut albums